Fraxinus longicuspis (syn. Fraxinus pubinervis), the taper-tip ash or Japanese ash (a name it shares with other members of its genus), is a species of flowering plant in the family Oleaceae, native to the mountains of central and southern Japan. A deciduous tree, it is hardy to USDA zone5. It is used as a street tree in a few cities around the world.

References

longicuspis
Endemic flora of Japan
Plants described in 1846